Map of places in Dumfries and Galloway compiled from this list

This List of places in Dumfries and Galloway is a list of links for any town, village, hamlet, castle, golf course, historic house, hill fort, lighthouse, nature reserve, reservoir, river, loch, and other place of interest in the historic counties of Kirkcudbrightshire, Dumfriesshire and Wigtownshire within the Dumfries and Galloway council area of Scotland.

A
Ae
Airds of Kells
Airieland
Amisfield
Anglo-Scottish border
Annan, Annan railway station
Annandale, Annandale Water
Anwoth
Ardwell
Auchen Castle
Auchencairn, Auchencairn Bay

B
Balcary Point
Balmaclellan
Balmaghie
Bankend
Bargrennan
Beattock
Beeswing
Bogrie Hill
Bogue
Borgue
Bridge of Dee
Brydekirk

C
Caerlaverock, Caerlaverock Cairn, Caerlaverock Castle, Caerlaverock NNR, 
Cairngaan
Cairn Valley, Cairn Valley Light Railway
Cairnryan
Canonbie
Capenoch Loch
Cardoness Castle
Cargenbridge
Carlingwark Loch
Carrutherstown
Carsphairn
Castle Douglas, Castle Douglas Art Gallery, Castle Douglas and Dumfries Railway
Castle Kennedy
Chapelcross nuclear power station
Clarebrand
Clarencefield
Cornharrow Hill
Corsewall, Corsewall Lighthouse
Corsock
Craigenputtock
Creetown
Criffel
Crocketford
Crossmichael 

Cummertrees

D
Dalbeattie
Dalton
Dornock
Drumcoltran Tower
Drumlanrig, Drumlanrig Castle
Drummore
Dryfesdale
Dryfe Water
Dumfries, Dumfries railway station
Dundrennan, Dundrennan Abbey, Dundrennan Range
Dunscore

E
Eaglesfield
Eastriggs
Ecclefechan
Eskdalemuir

G
Galabank
Galloway Forest Park, Galloway hydro-electric power scheme
Garlieston
Gatehouse of Fleet
Gatelawbridge
Glencaple
 Glencartholm
Glenkiln Sculpture Park 
Glenlochar
Glenluce
Greenhillstairs
Gretna
Gretna Green, Gretna Green railway station

H
Haugh of Urr
Hoddom, Hoddom Castle, Hoddom Mains

I
Isle of Whithorn
Islesteps

J
Johnstonebridge

K
Keir
Kenmure Castle
Kingholm Quay
Kippford
Kirkbean 
Kirkbride 
Kirkcolm
Kirkconnel railway station,
Kirkconnel, 
Kirkconnell Flow, 
Kirkcowan
Kirkcudbright
Kirkpatrick Durham
Kirkpatrick-Fleming

L
Langholm
Lauriston
Leadhills and Wanlockhead Branch, Leadhills and Wanlockhead Railway, 
Lincluden Collegiate Church
Loch Ken
Locharbriggs
Lochar Water
Lochmaben
Lockerbie, Lockerbie railway station
Lowther Hills

M
Machars
MacLellan's Castle
Middlebie
Millhousebridge
Milton Loch
Moffat
Moniaive
Mossdale
Motte of Urr
Mouswald
Mull of Galloway

N
New Abbey
New Galloway
New Luce
Newton Stewart
Newton Wamphray
Nithsdale

P
Palmerston Park
Parton
Penpont
Polharrow Burn
Port William
Portpatrick, Portpatrick and Wigtownshire Joint Railway
Palnackie

R
Rhins of Galloway
Rigg
Ringford
River Annan, River Esk, River Nith
Robgill Tower
Ruthwell, Ruthwell Cross

S
Samye Ling Monastery and Tibetan Centre
Sandhead
Sanquhar, Sanquhar Castle, Sanquhar railway station
Scaur Water
Shinnel Water
Solway Firth, Solwaybank
Southern Upland Way
Southerness, Southerness Lighthouse
Springholm
Stair Park
Stewartry Museum
St. John's Town of Dalry
St. Mungo's Church
Stranraer, Stranraer railway station
Sweetheart Abbey

T
Templand
Terregles
Thornhill
Threave Castle, Threave Gardens
Torthorwald
Twynholm
Tynron

U
Unthank
Urr Water

W
Wanlockhead
Water of Ken
Waterbeck
Whithorn
Wigtown
Wildfowl and Wetlands Trust

See also
List of places in Scotland

Geography of Dumfries and Galloway
Lists of places in Scotland
Populated places in Scotland